Eckmansville is an unincorporated community in Adams County, in the U.S. state of Ohio.

History
A post office called Eckmansville was established in 1839. The town site was platted around 1850. The community was named for its proprietor, Henry Eckman.

References

Unincorporated communities in Adams County, Ohio
1839 establishments in Ohio
Populated places established in 1839
Unincorporated communities in Ohio